Jean-Luc Sandoz (born 1960 in Montandon) is a French-Swiss engineer and an expert in wood construction. He is the founder of several companies in the field of engineering, industrialization, construction and expertise, all related to wood. Formerly, he was a professor and lecturer at EPFL (École Polytechnique Fédérale de Lausanne).

Career 
Born into a family of farmers in the Haut-Doubs region, he became acquainted with the material wood, starting with a vocational training certificate in carpentry, followed by a BEP (vocational training certificate) in cabinetmaking, before joining the Lycée Bois de Mouchard in 1976, where he obtained a BTS (vocational training certificate) in wood construction.

After studies at ENSTIB (École Nationale Supérieure des Technologies et des Industries du Bois), in 1985, he began his thesis on the subject of ultrasound and the mechanical strength of wood, under the direction of Julius Natterer at EPFL. He obtained his PhD in 1990 for his thesis entitled "Triage et fiabilité des bois de construction: validité de la méthode ultrason" (Sorting and reliability of construction timber: validity of the ultrasonic method).

He continued research at the IBOIS (Laboratory for Timber Construction) at EPFL  in two areas: non-destructive technologies to measure the mechanical quality of wood material and the optimisation of wooden structures for the application in large buildings.

In 1993, he was appointed assistant professor at EPFL.
Together with Julius Natterer and Martial Rey, Sandoz authored the textbook "Construction en Bois" (Wood Construction that has remained in print since its release in 1996 (20 new editions).

During this period he organised several international symposia among them the Symposium on Nondestructive Testing of Wood and the World Conference on Timber Engineering.

He registered several patents such as for a device for measuring the characteristics of wood using ultrasound (Sylvatest), and an application for measuring wooden poles for overhead electricity and telephone lines (K-Store & Polux), as well as for the construction of wood and mixed wood-concrete slabs as the Ariane truss.

In 1999, Sandoz left the academic world to devote himself to his company.

Wooden structures 
Sandoz integrates wood in all types of structures and buildings and optimises spans and heights, as well as for thermal and acoustic performance. Several of his projects won awards.

Examples of Sandoz' structures:
 For the Swiss national exhibition Expo.02 in 2002, he designed and built the offshore platforms that were placed on the lakes of Neuchâtel and Bienne to house the temporary exhibition pavilions. Made of local wood, the entire wooden structure was dismantled and reused after the expo period.
 In 2006–2007, he inspected the residual performance of the wooden structure of the Forbidden City in Beijing
 In 2017, he collaborated on the construction of the Guiana Space Centre and helped with the characterisation and employment of local wood from the Amazonian forest.
 In 2019, he used wood to clad the Vortex building, which served as the Olympic village for the 2020 Winter Youth Olympic Games in Lausanne before taking on its present function as student accommodation

Selected works

References

External links 
 
 Website of the company CBS-CBT

1960 births
Living people
École Polytechnique Fédérale de Lausanne alumni
Structural engineers
French engineers
Swiss engineers